Amalda booleyi is a species of sea snail, a marine gastropod mollusk in the family Ancillariidae.

Description

Distribution
Andaman Islands

References

booleyi
Gastropods described in 1896